Seminole Canyon State Park and Historic Site is a state park in the U.S. state of Texas. The park is conducive to camping, biking, bird watching, back packing and archeological study. Cave art and archeological artifacts date back to the earliest human habitation in the area. The park is part of the larger Seminole Canyon Archeological District on the National Register of Historic Places.

History
Seminole Canyon State Park and Historic Site is a  site operated by the Texas Parks and Wildlife Department. It is located off U.S. Route 90 in Val Verde County, and is accessible via Park Road 67. It is adjacent to Amistad National Recreation Area. It is estimated that human habitation of the area began 10,000 years ago, during the Holocene era when mammoth animals would have also inhabited the area. Vegetation is believed to have been a denser and richer variety to support the life of the area.  The erosion that happened over the ages can be seen in some of the area rock walls. Indigenous peoples began to leave cave art evidence of their presence some 2,000–8,000 years ago.

Gaspar Castaño de Sosa is believed to have been the first European to arrive in the area, during his 1591 trek up the Rio Grande and along the Pecos River, in his effort to establish Spanish colonization of New Mexico. During the 19th century the Black Seminole Scouts of the United States Army were stationed to the area, giving the region its name. The Southern Pacific Railroad built into the area in 1882.

 of the area was named in 1971 as the Seminole Canyon Archeological District on the National Register of Historic Places listings in Val Verde County, Texas.

The park opened in 1980.

Indigenous rock paintings

Rock paintings found in the park are of the Pecos River Style. Tours of the Fate Bell Shelter are conducted for the park by volunteers from the non-profit Rock Art Foundation.  Rock Art Foundation requests no guns, alcohol or pets be brought on the tours.

Panther Cave can only be viewed either from a distance along a hiking trail, or by boat boarded at the National Park Service dock in Amistad National Recreation Area. The cave derives its name from a painting of a leaping panther. Art in the cave dates back to an estimated 7,000 B.C. The large cat theme figures throughout the art, including humans with cat-ear head adornments

Fate Bell Shelter is named for the one-time owner of the land, Mr. Fayette Bell. First excavated in 1932 and later in 1963, the cave art and indigenous artifacts are believed to be some of the oldest in North America.  Tours are held Wednesday through Sunday, with limited hours during the hotter weather.

Facilities
Outside the entrance to the Visitors Center is The Maker of Peace, a 17-foot bronze statue created by Texas artist Bill Worrell in 1994.

Seminole Canyon State Park and nearby Amistad National Recreation Area are conducive to bird watching. Both are habitats for  numerous species of canyon, desert, and seed-eating birds.

Nine miles of trails lend to hiking and mountain biking. The canyons and Fate Bell Shelter are only accessible on guided tours.

The park has a restroom with showers. Campsites range from the very primitive with no conveniences, to some campsites with only water or campsites with both water and electricity.  There is also a trailer dump station.

Wireless Internet access (Wi-Fi) is available in some areas of this site.

Hours and admission
Seminole Canyon State Park and Historic Site is open seven days a week. Visitors must pay an entrance fee, and school group tours need to be coordinated in advance.

Gallery

See also

Museums in South Texas
National Register of Historic Places listings in Val Verde County, Texas

References

External links

TDPW Seminole Canyon State Park official site
Bill Worrell official site
The Rock Art Foundation
Moving images of Seminole Canyon State Park in Rock Art of the Lower Pecos on the Texas Archive of the Moving Image

History museums in Texas
Protected areas of Val Verde County, Texas
State parks of Texas
Archaeological sites on the National Register of Historic Places in Texas
Protected areas established in 1980
Texas state historic sites
Museums in Val Verde County, Texas
National Register of Historic Places in Val Verde County, Texas